Brenda Grace Agoyothé McKenna is an American politician, educator, and former political advisor serving as a member of the New Mexico Senate from the 9th district. Elected in 2020, she assumed office on January 19, 2021.

Early life and education 
A native of Nambé Pueblo, New Mexico, McKenna graduated from Pojoaque Valley High School in Santa Fe. Her father served in the Vietnam War and her mother worked as a dental assistant. McKenna earned a Bachelor of Arts degree in psychology from Syracuse University and a Master of Science in organizational development from Central Washington University.

Career 
After earning her master's degree, McKenna worked as a language program coordinator for the University of New Mexico Department of Linguistics. She also served as the public relations director of the Central New Mexico chapter of the League of Women Voters. She was the chair of the Nambe Pueblo Gaming Enterprise Board and worked as an examiner for Quality New Mexico, a non-profit based in Albuquerque. Prior to her election, McKenna worked as field representative in the district office of Congresswoman Deb Haaland.

In the 2020 Democratic primary for the 9th district in the New Mexico Senate, McKenna placed first in a field of three candidates. She then defeated Republican nominee John Clark in the November general election. She assumed office on January 19, 2021.

Personal life 
McKenna and her husband, Ralph McKenna, live in Corrales, New Mexico.

References 

Living people
People from Nambé Pueblo, New Mexico
Syracuse University alumni
Central Washington University alumni
Women state legislators in New Mexico
Democratic Party New Mexico state senators
Native American state legislators in New Mexico
People from Santa Fe, New Mexico
People from Santa Fe County, New Mexico
Year of birth missing (living people)
21st-century American women
21st-century Native American women
21st-century Native American politicians
Native American women in politics